The 1964–65 Gonzaga Bulldogs men's basketball team represented Gonzaga University during the 1964–65 NCAA University Division basketball season. In the second season of the Big Sky Conference, the Bulldogs were led by fourteenth-year head coach Hank Anderson and played their home games off campus at the Spokane Coliseum in Spokane, Washington.

References

External links
Sports Reference – Gonzaga Bulldogs: 1964–65 basketball season

Gonzaga Bulldogs men's basketball seasons
Gonzaga